Jack Hawkins (1910–1973) was an English actor.

Jack Hawkins may also refer to:

 birth name of Jack Hedley (born 1930), English actor
 Jack Hawkins (footballer) (born 1954), Australian rules footballer
 Jack Hawkins (politician) (born 1932), author and former politician from Nova Scotia, Canada
 Jack Hawkins (U.S. Marine Corps officer) (1916–2013), CIA senior planner of Bay of Pigs Invasion
 Jack Hawkins (actor, born 1985), British actor

See also
 John Hawkins (disambiguation)